Broughton Anglican College is an independent Anglican co-educational early learning, primary and secondary day school, located at Menangle Park, an outer suburb of south-western Sydney, near , New South Wales, Australia. The College caters for approximately 1,100 students from early learning, through Year K to Year 12.

The college was founded in 1986 by John Darlington, who was the Rector of St Peter's Anglican Church, Campbelltown, and began with the aim of providing secondary education based on Anglican principles for students progressing from St Peter's Anglican Primary School (Campbelltown). In 1997, the College added a Junior School.

The college has had three Headmasters, Ron Webb (Foundation Headmaster, 1986–2007), Paul Rooney (2007–2009), and Don O'Connor (2009–present).

In 2007 the school was affected by flash floods.

Academic achievement

The school was named in NSW's Top 200 Schools in 2007, 2010 and 2012.

See also

 List of Anglican schools in Australia
 List of schools in New South Wales

References

Junior School Heads Association of Australia Member Schools
Educational institutions established in 1986
Anglican secondary schools in Sydney
Anglican primary schools in Sydney
1986 establishments in Australia
Menangle Park, New South Wales